Say It with Music is a 1967–1969 Australian TV series which aired on the 0/10 Network (now Network Ten). It was a variety series with music, aimed at a middle-aged audience. The series was produced in Sydney. Hosted by Barry Crocker, regulars included Kathy Lloyd, Helen Zerefos and Neil Williams.

References

External links
Say it with Music on IMDb

Network 10 original programming
1967 Australian television series debuts
1969 Australian television series endings
Black-and-white Australian television shows
English-language television shows
Australian music television series